Greatest Hits is the first greatest hits album of American rock band Blink-182. It was released on October 31, 2005, by Geffen Records. Greatest Hits was created by Geffen shortly after the band's February 2005 breakup, termed an "indefinite hiatus" by the label. Tensions had risen in the group and guitarist Tom DeLonge desired to take time off. Bassist Mark Hoppus and Travis Barker argued with DeLonge regarding the band's future and their possible next album, and heated exchanges led to DeLonge's exit. In the interim, Hoppus and Barker continued playing together in +44, and DeLonge formed his new outfit Angels & Airwaves.

The compilation collects the band's most successful singles with one new song and a non-album track. The collection covers tracks from the band's debut album Cheshire Cat (1995) to their self-titled album (2003). Greatest Hits features numerous hit singles by the band, including "Dammit", "What's My Age Again?", "All the Small Things", "The Rock Show", "First Date", "Feeling This" and "I Miss You".

"Not Now", which was recorded during the Blink-182 sessions (and originally released as a bonus track on the UK edition of Blink-182), featured on the compilation and was released as its lead single; a cover of "Another Girl, Another Planet" by the Only Ones was sent to radio as an airplay single.

Greatest Hits peaked at number six on the Billboard 200 album chart. Critics were generally very positive regarding Greatest Hits, viewing it a suitable, reflective compilation of the band's hits. Andy Greenwald of Blender called it a "flawless compilation," covering the group's transition from "nudists to near-geniuses." The compilation was released alongside a DVD of the same name, a collection of the trio's music videos to that point in time. Greatest Hits has been certified platinum in Canada and triple platinum in Australia.

Background

By 2004, Blink-182, consisting of guitarist Tom DeLonge, bassist Mark Hoppus and drummer Travis Barker, had emerged as the biggest pop-punk act of the era, releasing the seven-times-multiplatinum Enema of the State (1999) and number one album Take Off Your Pants and Jacket (2001). The band had taken a brief break in 2001 when DeLonge suffered a herniated disc in his back, during which time he recorded an album—titled Box Car Racer—which contained darker musical material he felt unsuited for Blink. Barker provided drums on the album, and the project quickly evolved into a full-fledged band. It caused great division between DeLonge and Hoppus, who was not included and felt betrayed. The moody subject matter and music on Box Car Racer edged its way into Blink's sound as well on their next effort, an eponymous fifth studio album (2003). Geffen Records, after the success of Box Car Racer, offered DeLonge a solo recording deal, which he declined, feeling that it would cast a negative shadow over the band. Nevertheless, the possible deal loomed over the band, contributing to internal tension.

DeLonge became increasingly conflicted both about his creative freedom within the group and the toll touring was taking on his family life. He soon expressed his desire to take a half-year respite from touring in order to spend more time with family. Hoppus and Barker were dismayed, viewing this break as overly long. Following the 2004 Indian Ocean earthquake, DeLonge agreed to perform at Music for Relief's Concert for South Asia, a benefit show to aid victims. Further arguments ensued during band rehearsals: DeLonge asserted he would only record another album at his home in San Diego, suggesting he email Pro Tools files to Hoppus and Barker in Los Angeles. The duo were flexible regarding DeLonge's time off, but became angry when he began deciding "when we can and can't tour, [and] when and how we can record." DeLonge quit the band, coming to the conclusion that the trio had simply grew apart as they aged, had families, and gained fame. Rumors had already begun to swirl when the band unexpectedly pulled out of the benefit show, and intensified when Dave Navarro of Jane's Addiction posted on his blog that the band had "apparently" broken up. The band's label, Geffen, confirmed this on February 22, 2005, terming their dissolution an "indefinite hiatus".

Songs

Greatest Hits opens with "Carousel", which was the very first song Hoppus and DeLonge wrote together upon their meeting in August 1992. It has been described by journalist Joe Shooman as "a satisfyingly fast-assed punk song in the vein of NOFX with some very adept dynamic breakdowns." The band's first promotional single, "M+M's", follows, which is based around power chords and Hoppus' lead vocal of a vacation elsewhere. "Dammit", which was the band's first major-label single and also their first radio hit, is themed around maturity and the refrain, "Well I guess this is growing up." The distinctive riff of "Dammit" was created when Hoppus was forced to skip over the missing two strings on an acoustic guitar. It reached number 11 on Billboard Hot Modern Rock Tracks chart in 1998, and received heavy radio airplay. "Josie" is about "being stoked on a girl." It contains references to the bands Unwritten Law and Dance Hall Crashers ("My girlfriend likes UL and DHC"), two groups the band toured with in the mid-1990s.

"What's My Age Again?" was originally titled "Peter Pan Complex", referencing the subject matter: one who refuses to grow up. Its music video features the band running in the nude through the streets of Los Angeles and became an MTV staple. The power pop-inspired "All the Small Things" was composed by DeLonge as both an ode to his girlfriend and one of his favorite bands, the Ramones. The single, released in early 2000, was the band's biggest mainstream hit, peaking at number six on the Billboard Hot 100 and number one on the Modern Rock Tracks chart. "Adam's Song," the piano-laced seventh track of the compilation, was written primarily based on the loneliness that Hoppus experienced during unending days of touring in 1997-98. "Man Overboard" is based on former drummer Scott Raynor and his firing from the band for alcohol abuse.

"The Rock Show" details two teenagers meeting a rock concert, and, despite failing grades and disapproving parents, the two remain in love. Hoppus wrote the song based on memories of the San Diego club Soma. "First Date" was inspired by DeLonge and wife Jennifer Jenkins' first date at SeaWorld San Diego. The track was written as a summary of neurotic teen angst and awkwardness. "Stay Together for the Kids" is written from the point of view of a helpless child of divorce. DeLonge wrote the song based on his parents' own divorce. "Feeling This" follows, and "illustrates a scenario of lust, ambivalence and regret," according to journalist Jon Wiederhorn. Its lyrics were intended to represent the lustful side of sex during the verses, the passionate side in the bridge and the romantic side in the chorus.

"I Miss You" was recorded entirely acoustic, and covers vulnerability in relationships. "Down" continues the theme of longing, set to a rain-drenched soundscape. "Always" was inspired by 1980s music in its tone; its lyrics, according to DeLonge, are about "wanting to hold a chick all night long." "Not Now", a B-side from the band's 2003 album and first included on this compilation, features a church organ in its verses and guitar riffs reminiscent of the Descendents; its subject matter continues the theme of complicated miscommunication and fading love. The album closes with "Another Girl, Another Planet", which is a cover of the song by the Only Ones and was used as the title theme for Barker's MTV reality series, Meet the Barkers.

Release

Greatest Hits was first announced on August 29, 2005; it was initially slated to have a live version of "Man Overboard". The album's artwork is a smilie surrounded by arrows, which was first introduced on the band's 2003 album; it was illustrated by Mister Cartoon, a friend of drummer Travis Barker. In addition, the photography for Greatest Hits was supplied by another friend of Barker, Estevan Oriol. SA Studios handled the art direction for the compilation.

"Not Now" was selected to be the lead single, but was contested by the management between the former band members at the time. DeLonge's manager and original Blink manager Rick DeVoe supported "Not Now", while Hoppus and Barker's new management, Irving Azoff, lobbied for "Another Girl, Another Planet".

Commercial performance
In the United States, Greatest Hits peaked at number six on both the Billboard 200 and the magazine's Top Internet Albums chart, selling 72,000 copies in its first week. Greatest Hits charted highest in Canada, where it peaked at number three on the Canadian Albums Chart. The collection's second best performance arrived on Australia's ARIA Charts, where it peaked at number four. In the United Kingdom, the album also peaked at number six. The album also peaked at number nine in Austria, and number 12 on the French Albums Chart. The album charted lower in areas such as Japan, Germany, and New Zealand, but still within the top 40 of each respective country.

Critical reception
Andy Greenwald of Blender called it a "flawless compilation," covering the group's transition from "nudists to near-geniuses." Stephen Thomas Erlewine of Allmusic found the collection ran a little long, but overall deemed it an "intermittently entertaining collection."

Track listing

Song origins
 "Carousel" and "M+M's" are from Cheshire Cat (1995)
 "Dammit" and "Josie" are originally from Dude Ranch (1997) but appear as their single versions, which were remixed by Tom Lord-Alge at the time of their original release
 "What's My Age Again", "All the Small Things", and "Adam's Song" are from Enema of the State (1999) but appear as their single versions
 "Man Overboard" is from The Mark, Tom, and Travis Show (The Enema Strikes Back!) (2000) but appear as single version, which was remixed by Tom Lord-Alge at the time of their original release
 "The Rock Show", "First Date", and "Stay Together for the Kids" are from Take Off Your Pants and Jacket (2001)
 "Feeling This", "I Miss You", "Down", and "Always" are from Blink-182 (2003) but the single version of "Down" and "Always" have different endings than the album versions
 "Not Now" is from Blink-182 (UK release) (2003)
 "Another Girl, Another Planet" is from MTV's Meet the Barkers
 "Aliens Exist" (live in Los Angeles) is from "What's My Age Again" single (1999)
 "I Won't Be Home for Christmas" has previously been released as a standalone single (2001)
 "Go" (BBC Radio 1 session) is from "I Miss You" single (2004)
 "I Miss You" (live in Minneapolis) is from "Always" single (2004)

Personnel
Credits adapted from the album's liner notes.

Blink-182
Mark Hoppus – vocals, bass guitar, production
Tom DeLonge – vocals, guitars, production
Travis Barker – drums, percussion, production
Scott Raynor – drums, percussion on "Carousel", "M+M's", "Dammit", "Josie" and "I Won't Be Home for Christmas" (on international edition)

Additional musicians
Roger Joseph Manning Jr. – keyboards

Artwork
SA Studios – art direction
Estavan Oriol – photography
Rob Abeyta – design
Mister Cartoon – illustration

Production
Jerry Finn – producer, mix engineer of "Feeling This", "Not Now", and "Another Girl, Another Planet"
Mark Trombino – producer and keyboards on "Dammit", "Josie", producer on "I Won't Be Home for Christmas" (on international edition)
O – producer of "Carousel" and "M+M's"
Miti Adhikari – producer of "Go" (BBC Radio 1 Session) (on international edition)
Tom Lord-Alge – mix engineer

Steve Kravac – mix engineer of "Carousel" and "M+M's"
Ryan Hewitt – mix engineer of "Always" and on "I Miss You (Live in Minneapolis)" (on Japanese edition)
Joe McGrath  – engineer on "Don't Tell Me That It's Over" (on Japanese edition)
Brian Gardner – mastering
Dave Collins – mastering on "I Miss You (Live in Minneapolis)" (on Japanese edition)

Charts

Weekly charts

DVD

Year-end charts

Certifications

References

External links

Greatest Hits at YouTube (streamed copy where licensed)

Blink-182 albums
2005 greatest hits albums
Albums produced by Jerry Finn
Albums produced by Mark Trombino
2005 video albums
Pop punk compilation albums